The Statenville Formation is a geological formation of northern Florida, USA.

Age
Period: Neogene
Epoch: Miocene
Faunal stage: Chattian through early Blancan ~28.4 to ~2.588 mya, calculates to a period of

Location
The Statenville Formation is found in Hamilton, Columbia, and Baker County, northeastern flank of the Ocala Platform.

Composition
It is composed of sands of light gray to light olive gray color which not of great hardness and contains phosphate. The sand is fine to coarse grained with scattered gravel and with minor occurrences of fossils. Clay is yellowish gray to olive gray in color, poorly consolidated and variably sandy containing phosphate. Dolomite is in thin beds of yellowish gray to light orange, poorly to well indurated, sandy, clayey and containing phosphate grains.

The Statenville Formation partly overlies the Coosawhatchie Formation. Its permeability is generally low, forming part of the intermediate aquifer system. The phosphate content is of enough quantity to warrant mining.

Fossils
Mollusks (silicified) in casts and molds.

Shark Teeth

Petrified Wood

References

USGS: Florida Geology, Lithographic Units.
USGS: Geologic Map of the State of Florida.

Neogene Florida
Neogene Georgia (U.S. state)
Miocene United States
Miocene Series of North America
Geologic formations of Florida